The 2017 Veikkausliiga was the 87th season of top-tier football in Finland. IFK Mariehamn were the defending champions.

Fixtures for the 2017 season were announced on 19 January 2017. The season started on 5 April 2017 and ended on 28 October 2017.

Teams
PK-35 Vantaa were relegated to Ykkönen after finishing at the bottom of the 2016 season. Their place was taken by Ykkönen champions JJK.

FC Inter as 11th-placed team regained their Veikkausliiga spot after beating the second-placed Ykkönen team TPS 2–0 on aggregate in a relegation/promotion playoff.

Stadia and locations

Personnel and kits

Managerial changes

League table

Results
Each team plays three times against every other team, either twice at home and once away or once at home and twice away, for a total of 33 matches played each.

Matches 1–22

Matches 23–33

Relegation play-offs

First Match

Second Match

FC Honka won 1-1 on away goals.

Statistics

Top scorers
Source: veikkausliiga.com

Top assists
Source: veikkausliiga.com

Awards

Annual awards

Team of the Year

References

Veikkausliiga seasons
Fin
Fin
1